Nikki Craft (born 1949) is an American radical feminist activist and writer.

Activism

1970s
In 1975, Craft presented the Rockwell International board of directors with "...naked doll[s] splashed with blood-colored paint" to protest their B-1 bomber called "The Lancer".
The same year, Craft founded Women Armed for Self Protection (WASP), which advocated armed self-defense for women in the effort to keep violent men from assaulting them: "Women must perceive themselves as being worth defending. In a life threatening situation there must be no hesitation to pull the trigger", an activist group she was part of articulated. She also recorded "The Rape Song" about Inez Garcia and Joan Little.

In 1976, Craft co-founded the Kitty Genovese Women's Project (KGWP) when she and another activist posed as sociology students under the pretense of doing a "statistical study on violent crimes" and obtained the names of every indicted sex offender in Dallas County from 1959 to 1975. This was before such records were kept on computer; the activists worked for nine months writing all the names down on index cards. A year later, 25,000 copies of the KGWP newspaper were published. The paper listed all 2,100 sex offender indictments, 1,700 of which were multiple offenders, and was distributed throughout Dallas. On March 8, International Women's Day, the group read the names over local community radio KCHU for 13 hours.

In 1979, Craft helped organize the first Myth California Anti-Pageant in Santa Cruz, California. In 1980 Craft joined other pageant protesters and over the next nine years conducted other actions, including throwing raw meat on the stage and pouring the blood of raped women across a pageant entryway. One year three men locked arms on stage, yelling "Men Resist Sexism! Men Resist Sexism!" preventing the crowning until they were dragged away. There were many arrests, and each year the crowds grew larger at the anti-pageant protests which later resulted in the Miss California pageant leaving Santa Cruz. The protests continued in San Diego and in 1988, after the pageant left Santa Cruz and moved to San Diego, the winner of a local pageant unveiled a banner from her bra at the state finals that read "Pageants Hurt All Women." A documentary called Miss... or Myth? examines these protests.

1980s
In August 1984, Craft was arrested on Herring Cove Beach at Cape Cod National Seashore while protesting the park's public nudity regulations by sunbathing topless, refusing to put on a shirt when contacted by park rangers. After the U.S. Attorney's office declined to prosecute the case several months later, she returned to Cape Cod the following July and repeated the challenge, this time in the parking lot of the ranger station. She later organized a class action suit funded by the Naturist Society against the federal government, which manages the Seashore.
Later in the proceedings, she and others withdrew from the case because the Society's attorney had made concessions to the respondents related to clothing requirements for Seashore visitors that included gender distinctions, specifically, the covering of women's breasts.

In 1986, Craft was arrested in Rochester, New York with six other women who were topless or "shirtfree" in public. The case was dismissed on appeal six years later, thus weakening the New York "exposure of a person" state law when pertaining to woman's breasts.

1990s and onward
In 1990, Craft opened the Andrea Dworkin Online Library. In 1992, Diana E. H. Russell dedicated her book Femicide to Craft. In 1997 Dworkin dedicated her book Life and Death to Craft. In 2000, Craft and D.A. Clarke organized "Feminists for Nader" and campaigned for the Ralph Nader presidential campaign, 2000.

In 1995, the feminist journal On the Issues published Craft's article entitled "Busting Mister Short-Eyes" about a naturist child rapist sentenced to 30 years in prison, partly as a result of Craft's advocacy.

In 2001, she protested the War in Afghanistan and called upon other feminists to do the same. In 2005, she created the "Hustling the Left" website, criticizing leaders in leftist and progressive movements who published articles, interviews and expressed public cooperation with Larry Flynt and his magazine, Hustler. The website took its name from a June 2005 article by feminist activist Aura Bogado, who protested the promotion of Flynt's support by the anti-war group Not in Our Name. Craft also runs the  "No Status Quo" website.

Further reading
  Pdf.
See also: 
"Introduction"  to chapter by Diana E. H. Russell pp. 325-327.
"The evidence of pain" by D. A. Clarke pp. 331-336.
"The rampage against Penthouse" by Melissa Farley pp. 339-345.

References

External links
 The Nikki Wiki: All About Nikki Craft – her personal web site

Anti-pornography feminists
Civil disobedience
American feminists
Living people
1949 births
Radical feminists
Social nudity advocates